National syndicalism is a far-right adaptation of syndicalism to suit the broader agenda of integral nationalism.  National syndicalism developed in France in the early 20th century, and then spread to Italy, Spain, and Portugal. It is generally considered a variant or school of fascism.

France 
French national syndicalism was an adaptation of Georges Sorel's version of revolutionary syndicalism to the monarchist ideology of integral nationalism, as practised by Action Française. Action Française was a French nationalist-monarchist movement led by Charles Maurras.

Background (1900–1908) 
In 1900, Charles Maurras declared in Action Française'''s newspaper that anti-democratic socialism is the "pure"
and correct form of socialism. From then on, he and other members of Action Française (like Jacques Bainville, Jean Rivain, and Georges Valois) interested in Sorel's thought discussed the similarity between the movements in Action Française's conferences and in essays published in the movement's newspaper, hoping to form a collaboration with revolutionary syndicalists. Such collaboration was formed in 1908 with a group of labor unions' leaders led by Émile Janvion. As a result of this collaboration, Janvion founded the anti-republican journal Terre libre.

 Beginning (1909) 
Georges Sorel is sometimes described as the father of revolutionary syndicalism.James Ramsay McDonald, Syndicalism: A Critical Examination, London, UK, Constable & Co. Ltd., 1912, p. 7 He supported militant trade unionism to combat the corrupting influences of parliamentary parties and politics, even if the legislators were distinctly socialist. As a French Marxist who supported Lenin, Bolshevism and Mussolini concurrently in the early 1920s, Jacob L. Talmon, The Myth of the Nation and the Vision of Revolution: The Origins of Ideological Polarization in the 20th Century, University of California Press (1981) p. 451. Sorel's March 1921 conversations with Jean Variot, published in Variot's Propos de Georges Sorel, (1935) Paris, pp. 53-57, 66-86 passim Sorel promoted the cause of the proletariat in class struggle, and the "catastrophic polarization" that would arise through social myth-making of general strikes. The intention of syndicalism was to organize strikes to abolish capitalism; not to supplant it with State socialism, but rather to build a society of worker-class producers. This Sorel regarded as "truly true" Marxism.

In 1909, the integral nationalists Action Française began to work with Sorel. The connection was formed after Sorel read the second edition of Maurras' book, Enquête sur la monarchie. Maurras favorably mentioned Sorel and revolutionary syndicalism in the book, and even sent a copy of the new edition to Sorel. Sorel read the book, and in April 1909 wrote a praising letter to Maurras. Three months later, on 10 July, Sorel published in Il Divenire sociale (the leading journal of Italian revolutionary syndicalism) an essay admiring Maurras and Action Française. Sorel based his support on his anti-democratic thought. For example, he claimed that Action Française was the only force capable to fight against democracy. Action Française reprinted the essay in its newspaper on 22 August, titled "Anti-parliamentary Socialists".

 La cité française and L'Indépendance (1910–1913) 
In 1910 Sorel and Valois decided to create a journal called La cité française. A prospectus for the new journal was published in July 1910, signed by both revolutionary syndicalists (Georges Sorel and Édouard Berth) and Action Française members (Jean Variot, Pierre Gilbert and Georges Valois). La cité française never got off the ground because of Georges Valois's animosity toward Jean Variot.

After the failure of La cité française, Sorel decided to found his own journal. Sorel's biweekly review, called L'Indépendance, was published from March 1911 to July 1913. Its themes were the same as the journal of Action Française, such as nationalism, antisemitism, and a desire to defend the French culture and heritage of ancient Greece and Rome.

 Cercle Proudhon 

During the preparations for launching La Cité française, Sorel encouraged Berth and Valois to work together. In March 1911, Henri Lagrange (a member of Action Française) suggested to Valois that they found an economic and social study group for nationalists. Valois persuaded Lagrange to open the group to non-nationalists who were anti-democratic and syndicalists. Valois wrote later that the aim of the group was to provide "a common platform for nationalists and leftist anti-democrats".

The new political group, called Cercle Proudhon, was founded on 16 December 1911. It included Berth, Valois, Lagrange, the syndicalist Albert Vincent and the royalists Gilbert Maire, René de Marans, André Pascalon, and Marius Riquier. As the name Cercle Proudhon suggests, the group was inspired by Pierre-Joseph Proudhon. It was also inspired by Georges Sorel and Charles Maurras. In January 1912 the journal of Cercle Proudhon was first published, entitled Cahiers du cercle Proudhon.

 Italy 

In the early 20th century, nationalists and syndicalists were increasingly influencing each other in Italy. From 1902 to 1910, a number of Italian revolutionary syndicalists including Arturo Labriola, Agostino Lanzillo, Angelo Oliviero Olivetti, Alceste De Ambris, Filippo Corridoni and Sergio Panunzio sought to unify the Italian nationalist cause with the syndicalist cause and had entered into contact with Italian nationalist figures such as Enrico Corradini. These Italian national syndicalists held a common set of principles: the rejection of bourgeois values, democracy, liberalism, Marxism, internationalism, and pacifism while promoting heroism, vitalism, and violence. Not all Italian revolutionary syndicalists joined the Fascist cause, but most syndicalist leaders eventually embraced nationalism and "were among the founders of the Fascist movement," where "many even held key posts" in Mussolini's regime. Benito Mussolini declared in 1909 that he had converted over to revolutionary syndicalism by 1904 during a general strike.

Enrico Corradini promoted a form of national syndicalism that utilized Maurassian nationalism alongside the syndicalism of Georges Sorel. Corradini spoke of the need for a national syndicalist movement that would be able to solve Italy's problems, led by elitist aristocrats and anti-democrats who shared a revolutionary syndicalist commitment to direct action through a willingness to fight. Corradini spoke of Italy as being a "proletarian nation" that needed to pursue imperialism in order to challenge the "plutocratic" nations of France and the United Kingdom. Corradini's views were part of a wider set of perceptions within the right-wing Italian Nationalist Association (ANI) that claimed that Italy's economic backwardness was caused by corruption within its political class, liberalism, and division caused by "ignoble socialism". The ANI held ties and influence amongst conservatives, Catholics, and the business community.

A number of Italian fascist leaders began to relabel national syndicalism as Fascist syndicalism. Mussolini was one of the first to disseminate this term, explaining that "Fascist syndicalism is national and productivistic… in a national society in which labor becomes a joy, an object of pride and a title to nobility." By the time Edmondo Rossoni became secretary-general of the General Confederation of Fascist Syndical Corporations in December 1922, other Italian national syndicalists were adopting the "Fascist syndicalism" phrase in their aim at "building and reorganizing political structures… through a synthesis of State and labor". An early leader in Italian trade unionism, Rossoni and other fascist syndicalists not only took the position of radical nationalism, but favored "class struggle". Seen at the time as "radical or leftist elements," Rossoni and his syndicalist cadre had "served to some extent to protect the immediate economic interests of the workers and to preserve their class consciousness". Rossoni was dismissed from his post in 1928, which could have been due to his powerful leadership position in the Fascist unions, and his hostilities to the business community, occasionally referring to industrialists as "vampires" and "profiteers".

With the outbreak of World War I, Sergio Panunzio noted the national solidarity within France and Germany that suddenly arose in response to the war and claimed that should Italy enter the war, the Italian nation would become united and would emerge from the war as a new nation in a "Fascio nazionale" (national union) that would be led by an aristocracy of warrior-producers that would unite Italians of all classes, factions, and regions into a disciplined socialism.

In November 1918, Mussolini defined national syndicalism as a doctrine that would unite economic classes into a program of national development and growth.

 Iberian Peninsula 

National syndicalism in the Iberian Peninsula is a political theory very similar to the Fascist idea of corporatism, inspired by Integralism and the Action Française (for a French parallel, see Cercle Proudhon). It was formulated in Spain by Ramiro Ledesma Ramos in a manifesto published in his periodical La Conquista del Estado'' on 14 March 1931. National syndicalism under Franco aimed to provide a suitable replacement for capitalist mode of production with worker managed cooperatives, a system in which workers and employers elect representatives to form syndicates/corporations which manage worker and employer relationships and instantiating and promulgate worker ownership. 

National syndicalism was intended to win over the anarcho-syndicalist Confederación Nacional del Trabajo (CNT) to a corporatist nationalism. Ledesma's manifesto was discussed in the CNT congress of 1931. However, the National Syndicalist movement effectively emerged as a separate political tendency. Later the same year, Juntas de Ofensiva Nacional-Sindicalista was formed, and subsequently voluntarily fused with Falange Española. In 1937 Franco forced a further less voluntary merger with traditionalist Carlism, to create a single less radical party on the Nationalist side of the Spanish Civil War.
During the war, Falangists fought against the Second Spanish Republic, which initially had the armed support of CNT. National syndicalism was one of the ideological bases of Francoist Spain, especially in the early years. Franco’s brother who died fighting for the nationalist cause was also a syndicalist rebel leader in the Andalusian syndicalist revolt. Franco introduced in 1940 a radical syndicalist law that gave extensive rights to workers in the syndicates. In later years the rights of the syndicates became more constrained, but there are still examples of successful worker cooperatives such as the Mondragon worker cooperative that could develop under the wings of Franco’s national syndicalist regime. An example of worker cooperatives practicing worker ownership is Mondragon's ten union/co-op principles founded in 1987, one principle is for the sovereignty of labor. "Sixty years of the Mondragon cooperative experience showcase pathways to overcoming Labor commodification through wider, deeper and more inclusive worker ownership practices".

The ideology was present in Portugal with the Movimento Nacional-Sindicalista (active in the early 1930s), its leader Francisco Rolão Preto being a collaborator of Falange ideologue José Antonio Primo de Rivera.

The Spanish version theory has influenced the Kataeb Party in Lebanon, the Falanga National Radical Camp in Poland and various Falangist groups in Latin America.

The Unidad Falangista Montañesa maintained a trade union wing, called the Association of National-Syndicalist Workers.

See also 
 Corporatism
 Fascism
 National Trade Union Confederation of Finland
 Economics of Fascism
 Faisceau
 Syndicalism
 Proto-fascism
 Spanish Trade Union Organisation
 Falangism
 State capitalism
 Third Position
 Juntas de Ofensiva Nacional-Sindicalista

References

Further reading 
 
 

National syndicalism
Fascism
Syndicalism
Syncretic political movements
Third Position
Right-wing anti-capitalism
Anti-communism
Economic ideologies
Economics of fascism